Eder Luís de Carvalho, better known as Éder Baiano (born 14 May 1984), is a Brazilian retired footballer who plays as a defender.

References

External links 
 

1984 births
Living people
Association football defenders
Brazilian footballers
Brazilian expatriate footballers
Rio Preto Esporte Clube players
Ituano FC players
Guarani FC players
S.C. Olhanense players
Busan IPark players
Changchun Yatai F.C. players
Primeira Liga players
K League 1 players
Expatriate footballers in South Korea
Brazilian expatriate sportspeople in South Korea
Expatriate footballers in Portugal
Brazilian expatriate sportspeople in Portugal
Expatriate footballers in China
Brazilian expatriate sportspeople in China
People from Araçatuba
Chinese Super League players
Footballers from São Paulo (state)